The Baining Mountains is a mountain range on Gazelle Peninsula of New Britain island, in northern Papua New Guinea. 

The Baining languages are spoken in the region.

See also

References

Geography of New Britain
Mountain ranges of Papua New Guinea